Siegen-Wittgenstein is a Kreis (district) in the southeast of North Rhine-Westphalia, Germany. Neighboring districts are Olpe, Hochsauerlandkreis, Waldeck-Frankenberg, Marburg-Biedenkopf, Lahn-Dill, Westerwaldkreis, and Altenkirchen.

History
In 1816–1817, the two districts of Siegen and Wittgenstein were created as parts of the Prussian province of Westphalia. In 1974, the two districts were merged, and in 1984 the name Siegen-Wittgenstein was adopted.

Geography
Geographically, it covers the hills southeast of the Sauerland hills, the Siegerland and Wittgensteiner Land.

Coat of arms
The two upper sections show, to the right, the arms of the Dukes of Nassau, who founded Siegen, and to the left, those of the Counts of Sayn-Wittgenstein. At the bottom a miner's lamp and a coppicing hook are depicted, in reference to the mining and charcoal-burning history of the district.

Towns and municipalities

Towns
Bad Berleburg
Bad Laasphe
Freudenberg
Hilchenbach
Kreuztal
Netphen
Siegen

Municipalities
Burbach
Erndtebrück
Neunkirchen (Siegerland)
Wilnsdorf

References

External links

Official webpage 
History and genealogy for Wittgenstein

 
1357 disestablishments in Europe
States and territories established in 1174
Districts of North Rhine-Westphalia
Siegerland
Counties of the Holy Roman Empire